You're the Greatest Lover is a budget-priced compilation album by Dutch girl group Luv' released by PolyGram Netherlands in 1998. It features songs from the back catalogue of Phonogram/Philips Records, Luv's label between 1977 and 1979 when the female pop trio reached its peak in a large part of Continental Europe and South Africa. This album is named after the biggest hit record of the female pop formation: "You're the Greatest Lover".

Track listing
All songs written by Hans van Hemert and Piet Souer under the pseudonym 'Janschen & Janschens'.

"You're the Greatest Lover" – 2:50
 Taken from the album With Luv' (1978)
"Hang On" – 3:07
 Taken from the album With Luv' (1978)
"U.O.Me" – 2:57
 Taken from the album With Luv' (1978)
"I Like Sugar Candy Kisses" – 3:34
 Taken from the album Lots of Luv' (1979)
 "Trojan Horse" – 3:24
 taken from the German Version of With Luv' (1978)
"Saint Tropez" – 3:04
 Taken from the album Lots of Luv' (1979)
"Casanova" – 3:50
 Taken from the album Lots of Luv' (1979)
 "Who Do You Wanna Be" – 3:34
 Taken from the album With Luv' (1978)
"Eeny Meeny Miny Moe" – 2:53
 Taken from the album Lots of Luv' (1979)
"Honey, Money" – 3:16
Taken from the album Lots of Luv' (1979)
"My Man" – 3:05
 Taken from the album With Luv' (1978)
"If You Love Me" – 2:34
 Taken from the album Lots of Luv' (1979)
"Dream, Dream" – 3:30
 Taken from the album With Luv' (1978)
"Louis, Je T'Adore" – 3:40
 Taken from the album With Luv' (1978)
"The Night Of Love" – 3:32
 Taken from the album Lots of Luv' (1979)
"Oh, Get Ready" – 3:16
 Taken from the album With Luv' (1978)

Personnel
 José Hoebee – vocals
 Patty Brard – vocals
 Marga Scheide – vocals

Production
 Hans van Hemert – producer, songwriter
 Piet Souer – conductor/arranger

External links
 Detailed Luv' discography at Rate Your Music
 Detailed Luv' discography at Discogs

Luv' albums
1998 greatest hits albums